Tomi Mikkelsson (born 12 February 1997 in Pori, Finland) is a Finnish footballer.

References

Finnish footballers
Association football goalkeepers
Living people
1997 births
IF Gnistan players
HIFK Fotboll players
Helsingin Jalkapalloklubi players
Musan Salama players
People from Pori
Sportspeople from Pori